A statistical map may refer to:
 Cartogram
 Choropleth map
 Bivariate map

See also 
 Thematic map